Kheyrabad (also Romanized as Kheyrābād; also known as Khairābād) is a village in Mohammadabad Rural District, in the Central District of Zarand County, Kerman Province, Iran. At the 2006 census, its population was 770, in 183 families.

References 

Populated places in Zarand County